Baden Fletcher Smyth Baden-Powell,  (22 May 1860 – 3 October 1937) was a military aviation pioneer, and President of the Royal Aeronautical Society from 1900 to 1907.

Family
Baden was the youngest child of Baden Powell, and the brother of Robert Baden-Powell, Warington Baden-Powell, George Baden-Powell, Agnes Baden-Powell and Frank Baden-Powell. His mother, Henrietta Grace Smyth, was the third wife of Rev. Baden Powell (the previous two having died), and was a gifted musician and artist.  Baden did not marry - his mother was quite brutal in trying to keep her sons (and her share of their incomes) to herself.  He was god-father to, among others, his brother's daughter Betty Clay nee Baden-Powell.

Military, inventions and aviation
Baden-Powell was commissioned a lieutenant in the Scots Guards on 29 July 1882, and served with the Guards Camel Regiment in the Nile Expedition (1884–85) in Egypt and Sudan. Promotion to captain followed on 5 February 1896, and to major on 24 June 1899. He served with the 1st battalion of his regiment in South Africa during the Second Boer War, and was present at the battles of Belmont (23 November 1899), Modder River (28 November 1899), and Magersfontein (11 Dec 1899). He was in the Relief Column that in May 1900 relieved the siege of Mafeking, where his elder brother was in command. A month after the end of the war in late May 1902, Baden-Powell returned home with his regiment in the SS Tagus.

Baden-Powell was a military aviation pioneer and a Fellow and later President of the Royal Aeronautical Society and a Fellow of the Royal Geographical Society (elected in 1891). He was one of the first to see the use of aviation in a military context.  He also wrote, "Ballooning as a Sport", published in 1907 by William Blackwood and Sons.

He built his first balloons and aircraft with his elder sister Agnes.

He invented a man-carrying kite system which he called the Levitor. He also developed a collapsible military bicycle.

He obtained one of the first British patents for a television system, "An electrical method of reproducing distant scenes visually", published 19 April 1921 (GB161706).

He contributed to the Encyclopædia Britannica Eleventh Edition entry on 'kite-flying'.

He wrote "In savage isles and settled lands. Malaysia, Australasia and Polynesia, 1888-1891", published in 1892 by R.Bentley and Son, London. Among others, Baden-Powell recounts in his book a visit to Batavia (now Jakarta), where he was a guest at the dinner party hosted by a leading local magnate, Khouw Yauw Kie, Kapitein der Chinezen.

Scouting
Baden-Powell was the first who brought flying-based activities into Scouting in the form of kite and model aeroplane building. He can be considered the founder of Air Scouting even though he thought it was hardly feasible to have special 'Air Scouts'.

Baden-Powell was President and later District Commissioner of a North London District, was District Commissioner of Sevenoaks District, Kent between 1918 and 1935, and was Headquarters Commissioner for Aviation from 1923, until his death in 1937.

Notes

External links
 
Biography on pinetreeweb
The Engines of Our Ingenuity  No. 1233: Baden Baden-Powell
Pictures of the High Flying Competition of the Royal Aeronautical Society in 1903

1860 births
1937 deaths
Fellows of the Royal Geographical Society
Fellows of the Royal Aeronautical Society
Scouting pioneers
Baden-Powell family
Scots Guards officers
British Army personnel of the Second Boer War